
Jodocus Badius (1462–1535), also known as , , and , was a pioneer of the printing industry, a renowned grammarian, and a pedagogue.

Life
Josse Badius was born in the village of Asse (formerly Assche) near Brussels in Flemish Brabant in AD 1462. He was a scholar of considerable repute, studying in Brussels and Ferrara and teaching Greek for several years at Lyons, France. During the years 1492–1498, while in Lyon, he began working as a proofreader and editor for the printer Jean Trechsel.

He moved to Paris, where he established his own printing house in the year 1503, which eventually took the name . With 775 editions, it served as one of the most active publishers during the first three decades of the 16th century. He specialized in Roman classical texts in Latin, often with his own  for the student market. For example, for the 2nd-century BC Roman playwright Terence, Badius printed a Praenotamenta in 1502. This introduced the subject of Roman comedy through a lengthy treatment of general theories of poetry and thorough discussion of its origins, development, and classifications. He also published work by contemporary humanist writers. He frequently worked with or for Johannes Parvus (Jean Petit), the era's most important bookseller and publisher.

He was also the author of numerous pieces, amongst which are a life of Thomas a Kempis and a satire on the follies of women entitled Navicula Stultarum Mulierum.

Badius died in 1535. His epitaph was written by his grandson Henry Stephanus. His work was continued by his 2nd son, Conrad. After Conrad confessed to being a Huguenot, he was forced to flee to Calvinist Geneva in 1549.

Gallery

See also
 Editio princeps

References

Citations

Bibliography

 .

 
 

 
 
 

1462 births
1535 deaths
Printers from Paris
Flemish Renaissance humanists
People from Asse
French male non-fiction writers